Vazhvu En Pakkam is a 1976 Indian Tamil-language romantic drama film, directed by Krishnan–Panju and written by Mahendran. Soundtrack was composed by M. S. Viswanathan. The film stars Lakshmi (in dual roles; one is a dumb woman and the other one is a bold woman), R. Muthuraman, Srikanth and S. Varalakshmi playing lead roles, with Manorama, Suruli Rajan, K. Balaji, Vennira Aadai Moorthy and M. Bhanumathi in supporting roles. It was released on 2 November 1976.

Plot

Cast 
 R. Muthuraman as Raju
 Lakshmi as Saraswathy and Usha
 Srikanth as Kannan
 S. Varalakshmi as Vijayalakshmi
 M. Bhanumathi as Priya
 K. Balaji as Moorthy
 Manorama as Seetha
 Suruli Rajan as Neelakantan
 Senthamarai as Sathyanathan
 Vennira Aadai Moorthy as Muthu
 Aparna as Hema

Soundtrack 
Music was composed by M. S. Viswanathan and lyrics were written by Kannadasan.

Reception 
Kanthan of Kalki panned the film for the story.

References

External links 
 

1970s Tamil-language films
1976 films
1976 romantic drama films
Films about women in India
Films directed by Krishnan–Panju
Films scored by M. S. Viswanathan
Films with screenplays by Mahendran (filmmaker)
Indian black-and-white films
Indian romantic drama films